= Capital of the Revolution =

Capital of the Revolution may refer to:

- Homs, Syria
- Pyongyang, North Korea
